Erysimum repandum is a species of Erysimum known by several common names, including spreading wallflower, spreading treacle-mustard, and bushy wallflower.

It is native to Eurasia, but it is known in many other parts of the world as an introduced species and a common roadside weed.

The leaves farther up the stem are shorter, narrower, and more shallowly lobed or unlobed. The top of the stem is occupied by a raceme inflorescence of many yellow flowers.

References

External links
Jepson Manual Treatment
Illinois Wildflowers

repandum
Flora of Asia
Flora of Lebanon